Cheruiyot is a surname of the Kalenjin people of Kenya's Rift valley.  Notable people with the surname include:

 Charles Cheruiyot (born 1964), Kenyan long-distance runner
 Charles Cheruiyot (born 1988), Kenyan long-distance runner
Charles Cheruiyot Keter, Kenyan politician
Evans Cheruiyot (born 1982), Kenyan marathon runner, winner of the Chicago Marathon 2008
Jonas Cheruiyot (born 1984), Kenyan long-distance runner
Kenneth Cheruiyot (born 1974), Kenyan marathon runner
Kipkoech Cheruiyot (born 1964), Kenyan middle-distance runner, brother of Charles
Robert Kipkoech Cheruiyot (born 1978), Kenyan marathon runner, four-time winner of the Boston Marathon
Robert Kiprono Cheruiyot (born 1988), Kenyan marathon runner, winner of the Boston Marathon 2010
Robert Kiprotich Cheruiyot (born 1974), Kenyan marathon runner
Rose Cheruiyot (born 1976), Kenyan runner
Timothy Cheruiyot (born 1995), Kenyan middle-distance runner
Vivian Cheruiyot (born 1983), Kenyan runner
Zakayo Cheruiyot (born 1954), Kenyan politician

Kalenjin names